Frederick Robert May (7 September 1917 – 13 March 1945) was an Australian professional rugby league footballer who played in the New South Wales Rugby League (NSWRL).

Playing career
May played for the Eastern Suburbs club, who are now known by the name of the Sydney Roosters, in the years 1940 and '41. A five-eight, May was a member of East's premiership winning side that defeated Canterbury-Bankstown in the 1940 decider. The following year he was a member of the Eastern Suburbs side that was defeated by St George in the 1941 final.

Post playing
May enlisted in the Australian Imperial Forces (AIF) during World War II, and was killed in New Guinea.

References

Sources
 The Encyclopedia Of Rugby League Players; Alan Whiticker & Glen Hudson

Australian rugby league players
Sydney Roosters players
Rugby league five-eighths
Australian military personnel killed in World War II
1917 births
1945 deaths
Australian Army personnel of World War II
Australian Army soldiers
Rugby league players from Sydney